Aphelia gregalis is a species of moth of the family Tortricidae. It is found in North America, where it has been recorded from Alaska.

The wingspan is about 21 mm.

References

Moths described in 1981
Aphelia (moth)
Moths of North America